The Minnesota Morris Cougars football program represents the University of Minnesota Morris in college football at the NCAA Division III level. The football program was founded in 1961, a year after the University of Minnesota Morris was established. Minnesota Morris first joined NCAA Division II Northern Sun Intercollegiate Conference (NSIC) in 1966. With a conference record of 0–34 from 1999 to 2002, Minnesota Morris decided to join NCAA Division III Upper Midwest Athletic Conference (UMAC). Since joining the UMAC in 2003, Minnesota Morris' conference record is 55–77. The Cougars claim seven NSIC titles and one UMAC title: 1970, 1975, 1976, 1977, 1978, 1984, 1986, and 2006. Since 2006, the Cougars have played all their home games at Big Cat Stadium in Morris, Minnesota. The team's current head coach is Marty Hoffman.

History
The Minnesota Morris Cougars football team played its first game in the fall of 1961, a 6–3 victory over North Dakota State College of Science under head coach Bruce Rolloff. Minnesota Morris has played against Bemidji State University 39 times, more than any other team in Cougar history. The two teams have not faced each other since 2002, Minnesota Morris' last year in Division II before dropping down. Head Coach Al Molde led the Cougars to more conference titles than any other head coach in Minnesota Morris history, winning four consecutively from 1975–1978. The Cougars were unstoppable from 1975–1981, posting a 61–12–3 record under head coaches Al Molde and Dick Smith. Minnesota Morris then experienced a painful decline from 1990–2002, after winning just 16 of 130 games, causing them to drop to Division III in 2003.   A 2001 April Fool's issue of The University Register made fun of the losing streak in football by reporting that the recruitment of a multi-talented player named Jesus Christ had put the coach in a bind, "since they have 22 positions that need help."<

All-time record vs. UMAC opponents
This is the Cougars football record against current Upper Midwest Athletic Conference opponents.

Conference titles

References